Zidine may refer to:

 Zidine, Novo Goražde, a village in Republika Srpska
 Zidine, Tomislavgrad, a village in Bosnia and Herzegovina